Paul John Hallinan (April 8, 1911 – March 27, 1968) was an American clergyman of the Roman Catholic Church. He served as Bishop of Charleston (1958–1962) and Archbishop of Atlanta (1962–68). He was known as a champion of racial equality and liturgical reform.

Early life and education
Paul Edward Hallinan was born in Painesville, Ohio, to Clarence C. and Rose Jane (née Laracy) Hallinan. Both sets of his grandparents were from Ireland. From 1924 to 1928, he attended Cathedral Latin School in Cleveland, where he served as editor of the high school yearbook.

He then studied at the University of Notre Dame in Indiana, and there earned a Bachelor of Arts degree in Philosophy in 1932. He again edited the yearbook while at Notre Dame, and worked for the Painesville Telegraph during his summer vacations. He made his theological studies at St. Mary's Seminary in Cleveland.

Priesthood
Hallinan was ordained to the priesthood on February 20, 1937. His first assignment was as a curate at St. Aloysius Church in Cleveland, where he remained for five years. In 1942, he became an Army chaplain with the 542nd Engineer Amphibian Regiment, serving in Australia, New Guinea, and the Philippines. Holding the rank of captain, he was wounded in action on Biak Island and received the Purple Heart in 1944.

Upon his return to the Diocese of Cleveland, he served as a curate at St. John's Cathedral (1945–1947) and diocesan director of Newman Clubs (1947–1958). Using the G.I. Bill to finance his graduate school education, he earned a Master of Arts degree from John Carroll University in 1953. His father, who died in 1955, lived the last three years of his life with Paul while he was a chaplain at Western Reserve University. From 1952 to 1954, he served as national chaplain of the National Newman Club Federation. He was named a Monsignor during this time as well.

Bishop of Charleston
On September 9, 1958, Hallinan was appointed the eighth Bishop of Charleston, South Carolina, by Pope Pius XII. He received his episcopal consecration on the following October 28 from Archbishop Amleto Giovanni Cicognani, with Archbishop Edward Francis Hoban and Bishop John Krol serving as co-consecrators. His installation took place at the Cathedral of St. John the Baptist on November 25, 1958. He selected as his episcopal motto: Ut Diligatis Invicem, meaning, "That You Love One Another".

Recognized as one of the South's "foremost advocates of social and religious liberalism", Hallinan became known for his personal dedication to the civil rights movement and the cause of racial equality. In February 1961, he issued a pastoral letter in which he wrote, "With racial tension mounting, the Church must speak out clearly. In justice to our people, we cannot abandon leadership to the extremists whose only creed is fear and hatred." However, he delayed full racial integration at Catholic institutions in the diocese out of fear for the safety of African American students. Explaining this decision, he said, "The Catholics are 1.3% of the population in our state. If the full federal power cannot carry this off, it's fatuous to think we can. I would take the risk on high moral principles, but it would be a hollow victory if it wrecked our school system or did harm to our children."

Hallinan was also an advocate of ecumenism, and once wrote, "Never has this longing for Christian unity been more evident...We are growing more conscious that the Holy Spirit of God, brooding over our distressed world and our divided Christendom, is stirring now the souls of men in many places, providing the light and strength without which reunion remains an empty dream."

Archbishop of Atlanta

Following the resignation of Bishop Francis Edward Hyland as Bishop of Atlanta, Georgia, Atlanta was raised to the rank of archdiocese, and Hallinan was named its first Archbishop by Pope John XXIII on February 19, 1962. His installation took place at the Cathedral of Christ the King on the following March 29.

During his six years as Archbishop, he opened several churches and missions, as well as the John Lancaster Spalding Catholic Center at the University of Georgia. He transferred St. Joseph's Boys Home in Washington to Atlanta and converted it into the Village of St. Joseph for boys and girls. He also established The Georgia Bulletin, the weekly archdiocesan newspaper. In his final years, he was assisted in the governance of the archdiocese by his protégé and auxiliary bishop, Joseph Bernardin, who would later become a cardinal and Archbishop of Chicago.

In 1963, he earned a Ph.D. in History from Western Reserve University; his dissertation was a biography of Richard Gilmour, who served as Bishop of Cleveland from 1872 to 1891.

Civil rights
Continuing his advocacy for civil rights in Atlanta, Hallinan's first act as Archbishop was to order the integration of all Catholic institutions under his jurisdiction. "To call this action courageous," he said of his decision, "is a reflection on this community. We decided to move at this time to desegregate archdiocesan schools, first, because it's right, and second, because an excellent climate of opinion and action already exists here." He also sent priests and nuns to participate in the Selma to Montgomery marches, and encouraged Atlanta Catholics to open their neighborhoods "so Negroes can exercise the right of every American to live where he wishes."

In 1964, he was one of four Atlanta civic leaders who sponsored a banquet honoring Dr. Martin Luther King Jr., after he received the Nobel Peace Prize. He praised King as a "pioneer in a new dynamic of peace, expressed in the formula, 'I will walk in liberty, O Lord, because I seek thy precepts'."

Second Vatican Council
Between 1962 and 1965, Hallinan attended all four sessions of the Second Vatican Council. Appointed to the Council's Commission on the Sacred Liturgy, he became a prominent advocate for the use of the vernacular in the Mass. He described Sacrosanctum Concilium, the Council's constitution on the liturgy, as "a vote against old ideas...[it] paves the way for everything else." In one of his last talks, he said, "Through the Sacred Constitution on the Liturgy, we are now emerging from a period of fixity and rigidity which was unnatural in the Church's life." He befriended such progressive minds as Hans Küng and Cardinal Leo Joseph Suenens. In July 1964, he published a pamphlet, "How to Understand Changes in the Liturgy," that was distributed throughout the United States and abroad. He later served as chairman of the U.S. Bishops' Committee on the Liturgy and as member of the International Commission on English in the Liturgy.

Hallinan supported the cautious approach of Pope Paul VI towards internal renewal in the Church, saying, "We need some kind of brake for safety's sake. If we move too fast, we may not have time to communicate properly with our clergy and our laymen". In an attempt to increase the role of the laity in the Church, he appointed more than 125 lay men and women to ecclesiastical positions. He also called the first Lay Congress in the archdiocese.

He sat on the Board of Trustees of The Catholic University of America, and opposed the removal of liberal theologian Charles Curran.

Vietnam War
Unlike Cardinal Francis Spellman of New York, Hallinan was a staunch opponent of the Vietnam War. At a study conference of the Clergy and Laymen Concerned about Vietnam (CALCAV), he declared, "Our conscience and our voice must be raised against the savagery and terror of war." In August 1967, he was one of four American Catholic bishops who endorsed the Negotiation Now! campaign to end the war.

Illness and death
Hallinan contracted hepatitis on his return from the second session of the Second Vatican Council in December 1963. He was hospitalized for almost seven months and never fully regained his health, suffering from recurring bouts of the disease for the rest of his life. He eventually died from hepatitis at his residence in Atlanta in 1968, aged 57.

References

1911 births
1968 deaths
Roman Catholic archbishops of Atlanta
American civil rights activists
American Roman Catholic clergy of Irish descent
Deaths from hepatitis
Participants in the Second Vatican Council
People from Painesville, Ohio
Roman Catholic Diocese of Cleveland
Roman Catholic bishops of Charleston
20th-century Roman Catholic archbishops in the United States
Catholic University of America trustees
University and college chaplains in America
World War II chaplains
United States Army chaplains
Activists from Ohio
Catholics from Ohio
United States Army personnel of World War II
20th-century American academics